Blockade is a 2016 documentary film by Arif Yousuf on nonviolent peace activism in the US protesting the genocide of Bangladesh (then East Pakistan) in 1971. This depicts the story of nonviolent actions to stop the shipment of arms from the US to Pakistan during the 1971 Bangladesh Liberation War.

Synopsis
In early 1971, Bengalis in eastern parts of Pakistan had voted on their right to govern after a convincing election victory. Shortly afterward a humanitarian crisis and war extended down the Bengal Delta as the military dictatorship attempted to repress the people. The events eventually led to the birth of an independent Bangladesh.

Accolades

References

External links 
 

2016 films
2016 documentary films
English-language Bangladeshi films
Documentary films about Bangladesh
2010s war films
Bangladeshi war drama films
Films based on the Bangladesh Liberation War
Films set in the 1970s
1971 films
Films directed by Arif Yousuf
2010s English-language films
1970s English-language films